Miroslav Jurek (born 28 October 1935) is a Czech long-distance runner. He competed in the men's 5000 metres at the 1960 Summer Olympics.

References

External links
 

1935 births
Living people
Athletes (track and field) at the 1960 Summer Olympics
Czech male long-distance runners
Olympic athletes of Czechoslovakia
People from Boskovice
Sportspeople from the South Moravian Region